Singapore national football team has participated in the AFC Asian Cup since its inception in 1956. Singapore did not advance through the qualifying rounds except in the 1984 AFC Asian Cup which they qualified by hosting the tournament.

1984 AFC Asian Cup

Regarded as a much weaker team in Asia, Singapore was eliminated from the group stage with four points, a 2–0 win over India and a 1–1 draw with Iran. The draw with Iran was considered a shock result as Iran was three times champions of the tournament.

Group B

Singapore's performance in AFC Asian Cup

References

 
Countries at the AFC Asian Cup